Abdou Ousseni is the official from Comoros who served as Justice Minister and speaker and member of National Assembly of Comoros. He was elected as Speaker of National Assembly in 3 April 2020.

References 

Living people
Year of birth missing (living people)
Place of birth missing (living people)
Speakers of the Assembly of the Union of the Comoros
Justice ministers of the Comoros
21st-century Comorian politicians